The Minister for Finance in the Government of Australia is responsible for monitoring government expenditure and financial management. The current minister is Senator Katy Gallagher who has held the position since May 2022.

In the Government of Australia, the minister supplements the role of the Treasurer, being responsible for areas such as government expenditure, financial management, and the operations of government. The minister administers the portfolio through the Department of Finance.

The Finance Minister is in effect the deputy Treasurer (not to be confused with the Assistant Treasurer), as the Finance Minister acts as the Treasurer in the Treasurer's absence. Unlike the Treasurer, who by convention has been a member of the House of Representatives, the Finance Minister may come from either House of Parliament.

List of ministers

The portfolio was first created in 1977 by Malcolm Fraser's Liberal Party of Australia government as Minister for Finance. It was subsequently renamed Minister for Finance and Administration by John Howard's government in 1997, and as Minister for Finance and Deregulation by Kevin Rudd's government in 2007, then returning to Minister for Finance under Tony Abbott in 2013. It took on its current name under Scott Morrison in 2018; the Second Morrison Ministry removed Public Service from the portfolio in May 2019. The following individuals have been appointed as Minister for Finance or any precedent titles:

Notwithstanding Philip Lynch, John Howard and Wayne Swan who were Treasurers whilst serving as Finance Minister, two Finance Ministers who were from the House of Representatives, John Dawkins and Ralph Willis, then served as Treasurer.
In addition John Fahey (served 1996-2001) had previously served as Treasurer of New South Wales when he was also Premier of that state and current minister Katy Gallagher had previously served as Treasurer of the Australian Capital Territory including when she was also the territory Chief Minister.

 Morrison was appointed as Minister for Finance by the Governor-General on Morrison's advice in March 2020, with both Morrison and Cormann holding the position of Minister for Finance until October 2020, and then Morrison and Birmingham until May 2022. However, the appointment of Morrison was not made public until August 2022.

List of assistant ministers for finance
The following individuals have been appointed as Assistant Minister for, or any precedent titles:

Former ministerial portfolios

List of ministers for administrative services
The first minister responsible for Administrative Services was Fred Daly, although the portfolio was titled Minister for Services and Property from December 1972 until October 1975.  The portfolio was abolished with the resignation of David Jull on 25 September 1997 and its responsibilities were absorbed into the portfolio of Finance and Administration on 6 October 1997. The following individuals have been appointed as Minister for Administrative Services, or any precedent titles:

References

External links

 

Finance